Dennis Richardson may refer to:

 Dennis Richardson (diplomat) (born 1947), retired public servant, former Australian ambassador to the US, Secretary of the Australian Department of Defence, etc.
 Dennis Richardson (politician) (1949–2019), American politician
 Dennis Richardson (Hollyoaks), a fictional character in the British soap opera Hollyoaks